Colotis eunoma, the three spot crimson tip, is a butterfly in the family Pieridae. It is found in Mozambique, Tanzania, and Kenya. The habitat consists of coastal dune scrubs.

Adults are probably on wing year round.

Subspecies
Colotis eunoma eunoma (Mozambique)
Colotis eunoma flotowi (Suffert, 1904) (Tanzania, Kenya)

References

Butterflies described in 1855
eunoma